Mécanosphère is a trans-national music/performance art group rooted in Portugal. Formed in 2003 by French drummer and DIY electronic musician Benjamin Brejon (an ex-student of free jazz percussionist Sunny Murray ) and polyglot Portuguese vocalist Adolfo Luxúria Canibal, frontman of cult Portuguese rockers Mão Morta, the morphing line-up of Mecanosphere also congregates members of the American Radon Collective, such as tribal percussionist Scott Nydegger and saxophonist Steve Mackay (of The Stooges) as well as bassist Henrique Fernandes and drummer Gustavo Costa, all from the experimental scene of Oporto. Since 2005 the electronic multi-instrumentalist Jonathan Saldanha become an active part along with Benjamin Brejon.

Mécanosphère combines elements of sonic hip hop, bass-heavy dub, violent noise, collage art, chaos rock and industrial free jazz with a strong textual and old school sound poetry component, claiming authors such as J. G. Ballard, Gilles Deleuze, Peter Sloterdijk, Bernard Stiegler or Velimir Khlebnikov as influences on both the method and the issues of their work.

Mécanosphère's battering  rhythmic chaos music is something difficult to define. The polyglot text (a constant permutation of French, Portuguese and English) as well as the texture of their sound (several drum kits, electric double bass, electronic percussions, vintage synthesizers, tapes, live loop recorders, dysfunctional sound generators of varying kind) demonstrate the originality of Mécanosphère.

Mécanosphère is not a touring band. Each of their rather rare public appearances is a creation of its own and they made clear they consider the live performances unfit for a repetitive touring format. In comparison, Mécanosphère is a rather generous recording factory.

Their 2003 self-titled debut album (released on Portuguese Hip Hop label Loop:Recordings) is a straightforward rhythms-bass-voice record. Loosely in the line of early Scorn or Muslimgauze’s interpretations of dub and industrial music "mecanosphere" acts. The 2004 "Bailarina" album (Independent Records), explores a more labyrinth-like territory, where heavy bass down tempo breaks, electro-acoustic sounds, hardcore, tribalism, apocalyptic drum and bass and abstract jazz scapes fusion with the deep throat, menacing narrative of Adolfo Luxúria Cannibal. Their third album, "Limb Shop" (released on Raging Planet, Base records, Soopa and Radon in 2006), was produced by Jonathan Uliel Saldanha, moving the sound of the group a step deeper into an abstract landscape of field recordings, brute noise and crepuscular heavy funk and dub. Finally freed from the "track" shape which prevailed on the previous albums, Limb Shop is a 60 minute piece on disfiguration, real and fictional amputation vs. prosthesis and inner-space science fiction turned into sound.

References

External links

Portuguese musical groups
Raging Planet artists